Évette-Salbert is a commune in the Territoire de Belfort department in Bourgogne-Franche-Comté in northeastern France.

Population

See also

 Lac de Malsaucy
Communes of the Territoire de Belfort department

References

External links
Official website 

Communes of the Territoire de Belfort